Windsor is a town in Hillsborough County, New Hampshire, United States. The population was 262 at the 2020 census. It is the location of the Wediko Children's Services Summer Program and of Windsor Mountain International, a summer adventure and travel camp founded in 1961. It is also the home of Windsor Hills Camp and Retreat Center, a ministry of the Church of the Nazarene.

History 
Incorporated in 1768, Windsor takes its name from Windsor, Connecticut, the home town of grantee John Campbell. The town was made from the land that was left over from the surrounding Hillsborough County. Previously, the land was called "Campbell's Gore" as named for the aforementioned John Campbell.

Geography 

Adjacent municipalities 
 Washington, New Hampshire (northwest)
 Hillsborough, New Hampshire (east)
 Antrim, New Hampshire (south)
 Stoddard, New Hampshire (southwest)

Demographics 

As of the census of 2000, there were 201 people, 58 households, and 37 families residing in the town.  The population density was 24.1 people per square mile (9.3/km).  There were 120 housing units at an average density of 14.4 per square mile (5.6/km).  The racial makeup of the town was 97.01% White, 1.49% African American, and 1.49% from two or more races. Hispanic or Latino of any race were 0.50% of the population.

There were 58 households, out of which 29.3% had children under the age of 18 living with them, 53.4% were married couples living together, 3.4% had a female householder with no husband present, and 34.5% were non-families. 25.9% of all households were made up of individuals, and 8.6% had someone living alone who was 65 years of age or older.  The average household size was 2.40 and the average family size was 2.89.

In the town, the population was spread out, with 33.8% under the age of 18, 14.4% from 18 to 24, 22.9% from 25 to 44, 23.9% from 45 to 64, and 5.0% who were 65 years of age or older.  The median age was 26 years. For every 100 females, there were 187.1 males.  For every 100 females age 18 and over, there were 114.5 males.

The median income for a household in the town was $45,750, and the median income for a family was $58,750. Males had a median income of $36,250 versus $13,750 for females. The per capita income for the town was $17,966.  About 11.8% of families and 12.3% of the population were below the poverty line, including 32.4% of those under the age of eighteen and none of those 65 or over.

References

External links 
 
 New Hampshire Economic and Labor Market Information Bureau Profile

Towns in Hillsborough County, New Hampshire
Towns in New Hampshire